Joan Henley (2 September 1904 – 10 February 1986) was an Irish actress and radio presenter. She was active on the London stage since at least 1927 in ingenue roles, and appeared there throughout the 1930s. Her first film role was a supporting part in Purse Strings in 1933. She had a career of over 50 years in film and television, but her appearances were seldom and mostly small because she concentrated on the stage and her private life. She is probably best known for her role as the friendly spinster Teresa Alan in the Oscar-winning romance film A Room with a View, which was released less than a year before her death.

Joan Henley married Bruce Belfrage in 1930 and they had a son, Julian Belfrage, who became an actor's agent. After her divorce from Belfrage, she was married to author Laurence Meynell from 1956 until her death.

Filmography 
 Purse Strings (1933) as Ida Bentley
 Charley's Aunt (1938, TV Movie) as Donna Lucia
 School for Randle (1949)
 Reluctant Heroes (1951) (uncredited)
 The Common Room (1959, TV Series) as Miss Grenville
 Peridot Flight (1960, TV Series) as Lady Stilton
 The Reckoning (1970) as Mrs. Reynolds
 The Rivals of Sherlock Holmes (1971, TV Series) as Mrs. Wycherly
 Follow Me! (1972) as Dinner Guest (uncredited)
 Hadleigh (1973, TV Series) as Enid Broughton
 Dial M for Murder (1974, TV Series) as Dowager
 Days of Hope (1975, TV Mini-Series) as Lady Wimborne
 Armchair Thriller (1978, TV Series) as Lady at Garden Party
 The Thirty Nine Steps (1978) as Lady Nettleship 
 A Room with a View (1985) as Miss Teresa Alan
 The Good Doctor Bodkin-Adams (1986, TV Movie) as Mrs. Morrell
 Shades of Love: Sincerely, Violet (1987) as Maggie  (final film role)

References

External links 

1904 births
1986 deaths
Irish stage actresses
Irish television actresses
Irish film actresses
20th-century Irish actresses